The IFSA Network (previously known as the International Finance Students Association) is a global non-profit organization entirely run by students. Its main aim is to give students in the fields of finance, economics, management and engineering, a path to enter the professional world of finance by providing them with lectures, workshops, competitions and connecting them through a global network.

History 
The IFSA Network was founded in 2014 in Rotterdam, at the Rotterdam School of Management. Its first focus was to regroup people studying Finance, and connect them both between themselves and established financial actors. It quickly spread across Europe and Asia, before opening chapters in South Africa and the Americas.

Concept 
The IFSA Network is composed of different chapters throughout the world. The concept is to have semi-independent units, each composed of their own board & active members and to create synergy between these in order to provide the best opportunities to their members. The objective of the association is to build a comprehensive network that connects finance students across the globe and enable them to interact and communicate with each other.

Hierarchy 
Each chapter has a board, composed of at least a Chairman, Vice-Chairman, Treasure and General Secretary. This board manages day to day operations locally and supervises its regional activities. Chapters also typically have departments (Finance, Marketing, Events), with a department head managing the analysts.
Chairmen also regularly connect to establish international strategies and overview national operations.

There is also an International Supervisory Board which overseas the entire working of the network and its vision ahead. The current Supervisory Board is as follows :-

Sandesh Dholakia – APAC
Aditya Mahajan - APAC 
Ornella Gallo – LATAM
Pablo Torres Alarcón - LATAM
Iulia Rumeus – EMEA 
Janusz Skipiol – EMEA

Current Chapters 
As of 2021, The IFSA Network has the following chapters:

Africa

South Africa 
University of Cape Town

Asia

India 
Lady Shri Ram College for Women, Delhi

Shaheed Sukhdev College of Business Studies, Delhi

Birla Institute of Technology & Science, Pilani

St Stephen's College, Delhi

Indian Institute of Management, Kozhikode

Hansraj College, Delhi

Europe

Germany 
Catholic University of Eichstätt-Ingolstadt

Goethe University

Ludwig Maximilian University

Technical University

Lithuania 
Vilnius University

Russia 
New Economic School

Netherlands 
Rotterdam School of Management

Switzerland 
University of Geneva

University of Sankt-Gallen

Americas

Argentina 
Universidad del CEMA
Universidad de San Andrés

Brazil 
Federal University of Rio de Janeiro

Colombia 
Pontificia Universidad Javeriana

Universidad Externado de Colombia

Universidad Jorge Tadeo Lozano

Universidad del Rosario

Universidad del CESA

Universidad Nacional de Colombia

Universidad de los Andes

Universidad Icesi

United States 
Harvard University

Columbia University

Events

Traders' Cup 
The IFSA Trader’s Cup is the world’s largest student run trading challenge . All people studying in a recognised university are free to participate. The competition relies on securities trading, and aims to give students an opportunity to distinguish themselves from the competition. The competition is held once per academic year, starting in spring of 2016. For the second edition of the competition, students from more than 35 universities, located in 28 countries on 6 continents competed.

Global Case Competition at Harvard 
The Global Case Competition at Harvard  is the world’s most prestigious case competition organized by students. 
During the first edition, a team from HEC Paris, a leading French university, won the challenge.
The second edition was won  by the London Business School.

Local Venues 
The various IFSA Network chapters try to offer their communities various local events to connect with the professional world. Often, an industry professional will come to the IFSA Network events and meet students. The purpose of those venues is to give students a taste of the professional world, share tips and knowledge, and give an opportunity to network.

Boston Consulting Group Case Competition 
In 2018, the IFSA Network in cooperation with the Boston Consulting Group and InvestSoc, organised the first, three-week long International Cape Town Case Competition. The competition has a unique format where teams consisting of 2 to 4 participants, propose solutions for crises that are presented to them. In their solutions, participants are able to showcase their knowledge, creativity and problem-solving skills on a current macroeconomic issue. 
A jury picks the 15 best international teams and the best local teams, from Cape Town. The selected teams arrive in Cape Town, South Africa, to participate in the second round, and present in front of a select panel. The winning team is awarded a cash prize of 5000 South African Rand.

Citations

References

Business education